St. Peter's College (Sinhala: සාන්ත පීතර විදුහල, Tamil: செயிண்ட் பீட்டர் கல்லூரி) is a Roman Catholic boys-only primary to secondary (inclusive) school in the Bambalapitiya zone of Colombo, Sri Lanka, founded in 1922.

In 1919, just after the end of World War I, Fr. M. J. Le Goc, Rector of St Joseph's College, Colombo, wanted to start a college in the southern suburbs of Colombo, and acquired a block of cinnamon land in Bambalapitiya.

Construction began on 7 July 1921 under the supervision of J. R. J. Jayesuria, an alumnus of St. Joseph's College. In December 1921, Le Goc announced that St. Joseph's College South would open in January 1922.

The buildings were designed by Le Goc, and were built in six months. The quadrangle in front had an oval drive running around it. Le Goc also incorporated the concept of open-air classrooms.

The inauguration took place on Wednesday 18 January 1922. 204 students were admitted on that day and by the end of the year the number had risen to 268. The first rector was Fr. D. J. Nicholas Perera.  the rector is Rev. Fr. Rohitha Rodrigo, and there were 6,088 students.

St. Joseph’s College South

St. Joseph's College, Colombo was founded in March 1896. St. Joseph's College South, later St. Peter's College, was built on neglected cinnamon land bordering the Galle Road and alongside the Wellawatte Canal, starting on 7 July 1921.

On 18 January 1922, Fr. Le Goc with a large number of Josephian students and Staff opened the new school.

Thus was St. Joseph's College South born on 18 January 1922. Rev. Fr. D. J. Nicholas Perera was appointed President of the college, with classes from Grade 1 to Grade 7, while the number on roll was 204.

1956 - 1977

The period 1956 to 1977 covers the Rectorships of Five Rectors, all of whom were dogged by the problem of the Schools Take over bid, with severe financial constraints consequent to the decision by St. Peter's not to be vested with the State but to function as a 'Non Fee Levying Private School'. Nevertheless, and notwithstanding each of the five Rectors of this difficult era made their individual contribution to the progress of St. Peter's never succumbing to problems of the times.

Fr. Arthur Nicholas Fernando, who succeeded Fr. Basil Wiratunge as the Third Rector of St. Peter's from 1956 to 1963, developed Aesthetic Studies and started the first school's Fife and Drum band on 30 June 1956. A Cultural Centre to promote Music, Drama, Dancing and Art was started in November 1956 with the help of Fathers Mervyn Weerakkody and Marcelline Jayakody. Kandyan Dancing, Oriental Singing and the Western and Oriental Orchestras were set up. Rowing was introduced to St. Peter's in 1959, as also a unit of the St. John's Ambulance Brigade. On 1 December 1960 St. Peter's decided to remain as a private non-fee-paying institution. Arthur Nicholas Fernando set up the Welfare Society, a modern canteen, college boarding.

Fr. Mervyn Weerakkody succeeded Arthur Nicholas Fernando and was the Fourth Rector from 1963 to 1971. He formed the Parent Teacher Association. Boards of Discipline, Studies and Sports were formed. He established the Employees Provident Fund for the Teaching Staff. On 24 July 1971 he left St. Peter's to take up the Rectorship of St. Joseph's.

Fr. Theodore E. Peiris O.M.I., who had been on the Tutorial Staff of St. Peter's in the 1940s, succeeded Weerakkody, and was Rector from 1971 to 1975. He presided at the Golden Jubilee Celebrations of the college on 18 January 1972.

The Sixth Rector of St. Peter's, Fr. Claver Perera, was the first Peterite rector, from 1975 to 1976. He decentralised the administration with the appointment of Sectional Heads from Grade 6 to the Advanced Level. He enlarged and renovated the College Chapel for the first time in 50 years.

Fr. Francis Madiwela took over from Fr. Claver Perera, from 1976 to 1977. He arranged for the Old Boys to have their own president, from 4 December 1977. He transferred to St. Thomas, Kotte as Principal.

From 1978

Fr Joe Wickramasinghe took over the Rectorship for 16 years from 1978. He built a vocational training centre with a computer lab, audio visual studio, a science laboratory building, the swimming pool complex, new primary school building, new dental clinic, canteen and a mini zoo for the primary school. He set up scholarship funds to support students entering university and established a board of administration to assist in managing the school. The first branch school in Gampaha was opened.

St. Peter's College, Gampaha Branch 
The branch, St. Peter's College, Gampaha, was inaugurated by Archbishop Oswald Gomis on 2 February 1993, as the first Branch school in Sri Lanka after the Schools Takeover Act No. 8, passed in 1961.  it had more than 14 staff members.

St. Peter's College, Udugampola Branch
Oswald Gomis, the Archbishop of Colombo, initiated opening Branch Schools of the Catholic Colleges in Colombo and rural areas. St. Peter's College Branch School at Gampaha was the first of 10 branches opened . The Udugampola Branch School was opened on 24 September 2005 by Archbishop Gomis, and Rev. Fr. Siri Cooray was appointed Principal of the Branch Schools of both Gampaha and Udugampola in January 2007.  Fr. Suranga Fonseka became Assistant Priest to the school in January 2008.

New Chapel

A new Chapel at St. Peter's College Branch, Udugampola was blessed and dedicated by Archbishop Gomis on 21 October on the occasion of the 4th Anniversary of the Branch School.

Old Boys' Union - Gampaha and Udugampola Branches

On 15 March 2009, all the Old Peterites of Gampaha and Udugampola gathered to the Udugampola Branch School college hall to form the 1st Branch OBU under the main OBU at St. Peter's College, Colombo 04. Under the Guidance of Rev. Siri Cooray (Principal - Udugampola and Gampaha), 
Bernard Fernando (Vice Principal), 
Thilak Rodrigo (Vice Principal), 
Mrs. Chandani Perera, 
Suranga Senevirathne - President of SPC OBU, 
and Lasantha Dissanayake - Vice President of SPC - OBU.

Houses 
There are 4 houses in the Primary School and 6 houses in the Upper School.

Sports

Battle of the Saints
The Battle of the Saints is the annual cricket encounter between St. Peter's College, Colombo and St Joseph's College, Colombo commonly known as the College "Big Match". This consists of a two-day match and a limited-over encounter.

St. Peter’s Sports Centre
St. Peter's Sports Centre is an indoor sports complex that is built alongside the extended duplication road. This is a four-storey multipurpose sports complex consisting of four Badminton courts, a Basketball court and a concert hall which can accommodate roughly 1500 persons.

Past Rectors of the College

Notable Teachers 
 Rev. Fr. Marcelline Jayakody OMI - Well-known Sri Lankan Catholic priest, musician, lyricist, author, journalist and patriot.
 Ediriweera Sarachchandra - A famous Sri Lankan playwright, novelist, poet, literary critic, essayist and social commentator.

Old Boys' Union
A few months after the change of the name from St. Joseph's College South to St. Peter's College, the inaugural meeting of St. Peter's College Old Boys' Union took place on 15 October 1927, presided over by the Rector, Rev. Fr. Nicholas Perera.
From 1927 to 1977, a period of 50 years, the college Rector was ex-officio the President of the Old Boys' Union.
In 1977 Rev. Fr. Francis Madiwela mooted the idea of electing a President among members of the Old Boys' Union, with Rector becoming the patron of the union. Accordingly, a 3-man Sub Committee comprising J. A. R. Felix, C.E. Maurice Perera and George Wijesinghe was appointed to draft a new constitution incorporating the new proposal. This new constitution was adopted on 4 December 1977, and J.A.R. Felix was elected as the first President of the Old Boys' Union.

Past Presidents

Notable alumni

References

External links

Official Website
Old Boys Union
College Rugby Foundation

1922 establishments in Ceylon
Boys' schools in Sri Lanka
Catholic schools in Sri Lanka
Catholic secondary schools in Sri Lanka
Educational institutions established in 1922
Private schools in Sri Lanka
Schools in Colombo
Schools in Sri Lanka founded by missionaries